Catocala jouga is a moth in the family Erebidae. It is found in China (Yunnan) and Vietnam.

References

jouga
Moths described in 2003
Moths of Asia